Rauf Khalilov Azad oglu (born October 6, 1981 Baku, Azerbaijan) is a film director, composer, designer and producer. He is a member of the Directors Guild of Azerbaijan.

Biography 
In 1998 Rauf Khalilov graduated from the Azerbaijan State Academy of Fine Arts named after A. N. Alekperov , majoring in Music and Art. Since early age Rauf was also interested in mechanical engineering and astronomy which had a huge impact on his further work.

In 2002 Rauf Khalilov graduated from the Azerbaijan State Academy of Fine Arts with a bachelor's degree in Graphics.

Rauf is married, has one child. His father Azad Khalilov is a well-known painter of Azerbaijan.

Films and music 
Genres of Movies: drama, thriller.

Having made his first short film "One Minute and Four Seconds" in 2003 Rauf Khalilov began his career as a film director. He continued his career by making few other short films. Among them: "The Chairs" and "Stability". He directed his first feature movie “Ideal World” in Los Angeles in 2008. As a composer of electronic music in 2009 he released his first album "Monopolar World", followed by other well-known singles such as "Venus", "Good Morning Apollo" and "Out of Milky Way".

Video-Art 

2002 - Orientalism
2003 - Desire
2004 - Exit
2004 - 3Days
2004 - Leadership and Power
2005 - Universal Game
2007 - Gravity Life
2007 - Morning Starts at 0:01 am

Short films 

2003 - One Minute and Four Seconds
2010 - The Chairs
2011 - Stability

Feature film 

2008 - Ideal World  (Release in 2012) Los Angeles

Exhibitions and festivals 

2000 Wings of Time, Azerbaijan
2000 Azerbaijan State Art Academy, Azerbaijan
2001 Azerbaijan Artists Union "Young Artists Exhibition”
2001 UNOCAL Ecology Poster Exhibition, Azerbaijan
2002 Orientalism: Inside & Outside. International Exhibition, Azerbaijan
2003 "Aluminium" Art+New Technoligies Festival of Contemporary Art, Azerbaijan
2003 "Appendix" International Art Exhibition, Tbilisi, Georgia
2004 International Short Film Festival "Oberhausen", Germany
2004 IV International Audiovisual Festival, Azerbaijan
2005 International Short Film Festival "Detmold", Germany
2007 52nd International Art Exhibition - La Biennale Di Venezia, Italy
2007 “Realities of Dreams” Aluminium 3rd International Biennial of Contemporary Art, Azerbaijan
2008 “NYIIFVF” New York International Independent Film and Video Festival, United States
2008 “STEPS of Time” Exhibition ,  Dresden, Germany
2010 “USSR-remix” project of visual art, photography, video-art and multimedia, Norway
2011 “Festival de Cannes, the Short Film Corner”, France
2012 “Festival de Cannes, the Short Film Corner”, France
2013 “Azerbaijani family” film Festival, Azerbaijan

Music 
Genres of Music: - Ambient, Downtempo, Dub, Electro

References

External links 
 OFFICIAL WEBSITE
 НОВОСТИ-АЗЕРБАЙДЖАН  «Кинорежиссер Рауф Халилов представит свой фильм на Каннском фестивале»  (11 апреля 2011)

1981 births
Living people
Azerbaijani film directors
Azerbaijani film producers